United States gubernatorial elections were held in 1941, in the state of Virginia. Virginia holds its gubernatorial elections in odd numbered years, every 4 years, following the United States presidential election year.

Results

References

 
November 1941 events